The 1979 Pacific Tigers football team represented the University of the Pacific (UOP) in the 1979 NCAA Division I-A football season as a member of the Pacific Coast Athletic Association.

The team was led by head coach Bob Toledo, in his first year, and played their home games at Pacific Memorial Stadium in Stockton, California. They finished the season with a record of three wins and seven losses (3–7, 0–5 PCAA). The Tigers were outscored by their opponents 162–193 over the season.

Schedule

Roster

Team players in the NFL
The following UOP players were selected in the 1980 NFL Draft.

The following finished their college career in 1979, were not drafted, but played in the NFL.

Notes

References

Pacific
Pacific Tigers football seasons
Pacific Tigers football